Qarah Aghaj Poshteh (also Romanized as Qarah Āghāj Poshteh; also known as Poshteh-ye Qareh Āghāj) is a village in Yaft Rural District, Moradlu District, Meshgin Shahr County, Ardabil Province, Iran. At the 2006 census, its population was 445, in 103 families.

References 

Towns and villages in Meshgin Shahr County